Haripur  is a village and gram panchayat in Chanditala I community development block of Srirampore subdivision in Hooghly district in the Indian state of West Bengal.

Geography

Gram panchayat
Villages in Haripur gram panchayat are: Anantarampur, Bade Sola, Baghati, Ban Panchbere, Chak Bangla, Chota Choughara, Dudhkomra, Haripur, Ichhapasar, Jagmohanpur, Mamudpur and Radhaballabhpur.

Demographics
As per 2011 Census of India, Haripur had a total population of 2,797 of which 1,455 (52%) were males and 1,342 (48%) were females. Population below 6 years was 271. The total number of literates in Haripur was 2,066 (81.79% of the population over 6 years).

Transport
Bargachia railway station is the nearest railway station.

References

Villages in Chanditala I CD Block